The National Audit Office of the People's Republic of China is the supreme audit institution in the People's Republic of China. It was established in 1983 according to the Constitution. It is a cabinet-level executive department of the State Council and under the leadership of the Premier.

List of Auditors General 
The Auditor General is the head of the NAO.

See also 

 "Audit storm"
 Audit Office of the Central Military Commission
 National Supervisory Commission
 Ministries of the People's Republic of China
 National Audit Office (United Kingdom)

References

External links 
  
  

China
State Council of the People's Republic of China
Organizations based in Beijing
Government agencies established in 1983
1983 establishments in China
Supreme audit institutions